Hadfield is a suburb in Melbourne, Victoria, Australia,  north of Melbourne's Central Business District, located within the City of Merri-bek local government area. Hadfield recorded a population of 6,269 at the 2021 census.

The suburb of Hadfield is bounded by West Street in the west, South Street and Boundary Road in the south, Sydney Road in the east and Hilton Street in the north. Hadfield is located between Fawkner and Glenroy and falls within the 3046 postcode.

Major features of the area include the Fawkner Crematorium and Memorial Park, the West Street Shopping Centre and the Merlynston Creek.

History

Hadfield originally formed part of the John Pascoe Fawkner estate. Significant development occurred in Hadfield after World War II, with the Hadfield Post Office opening on 6 May 1957.

The name of the suburb comes from Cr Rupert Hadfield, who was a shire president for the Broadmeadows Shire Council (plaque on the Broadmeadows Town Hall). However, the website Australia for Everyone; Place Names, claims another origin.

Hadfield High School (1964–1991) is now the location of Pascoe Vale Gardens, a retirement village.

Demographics

In 2011, Hadfield had a population of 5,366. The median age of people in Hadfield was 39 years. Children aged 0 – 14 years made up 18.2% of the population and people aged 65 years and over made up 21.0% of the population. The most common ancestries were Italian 17.9%, Australian 15.3%, English 12.8%, Lebanese 8.3% and Greek 5.2%. The most common responses for religion were Catholic 42.9%, Islam 17.1%, No Religion 9.1%, Eastern Orthodox 6.9% and Anglican 5.7%. The suburb has high proportions of 5–17 year olds and over 70 year olds in comparison to the City of Merri-bek average, as well as a high proportion of Italian -Greek, Lebanese and Maltese residents.

Shopping

There are several small shopping districts that fall within Hadfield, the most prominent being on West Street, with others on South Street, North Street and East Street.

Sport

Hadfield Football Club, an Australian Rules football team, competes in the Essendon District Football League.

Transport

Bus
Four bus routes service Hadfield:

 : Gowrie station – Northland Shopping Centre via Murray Road. Operated by Ventura Bus Lines.
 : Glenroy station – Coburg via Boundary Road and Sydney Road. Operated by Dysons.
 : Glenroy station – Gowrie station via Gowrie Park. Operated by Dysons.
  : Brunswick station – Glenroy station via West Coburg (operates Saturday and Sunday mornings only). Operated by Ventura Bus Lines.

Cycling
The Upfield Bike Path and the Western Ring Road Trail provide facilities for recreational and commuting cyclists.

Train
One railway station services Hadfield: Fawkner, on the Upfield line. Despite the name, the station is in Hadfield, located within the Fawkner Crematorium and Memorial Park. Other stations nearby include Glenroy and Oak Park, both on the Craigieburn line, and Gowrie, on the Upfield line.

See also
 City of Broadmeadows – Hadfield was previously within this former local government area.

References

Suburbs of Melbourne
Suburbs of the City of Merri-bek